Donald Yearnsley "Trey" Wilson III (January 21, 1948 – January 16, 1989) was an American character actor known for playing rural, authoritarian-type characters, most notably in comedies such as Raising Arizona and Bull Durham.

Career
During his career, Wilson appeared in numerous stage productions and 30 films or television shows, including guest roles on Spenser: For Hire and The Equalizer. On stage, he co-starred in the ragtime-era musical Tintypes on Broadway, appeared in The Front Page at Lincoln Center and on Broadway, and appeared with Sandy Duncan in Peter Pan. He also appeared in Pat Benatar's music video "Love Is a Battlefield", as the father who throws her out of the house.

His most memorable roles on film were in Raising Arizona, as unpainted furniture store owner Nathan Arizona, and Bull Durham, as Joe Riggins, manager of the Durham Bulls minor league baseball team. The end credits of The Silence of the Lambs and Miss Firecracker dedicate the films to him.

Personal life and death
Born in Houston, Texas, to Donald Yearnsley Wilson and Irene Louise Wilson, he attended Bellaire High School in Bellaire and then majored in English and theater at the University of Houston. It was there that Wilson met Judy Blye, a well-known New York soap opera casting agent, and they were married on August 25, 1975. He was a cousin of former Texas Republican State Senator Kim Brimer.

Wilson died at age forty from a cerebral hemorrhage in New York City on January 16, 1989, and was buried at Forest Park Cemetery in Houston five days later, on what would have been his 41st birthday.

Released after his death, Wilson's final film was Great Balls of Fire!, the biopic of Jerry Lee Lewis, where he played American record producer Sam Phillips. He had been cast in the Coen brothers' film Miller's Crossing at the time of his death, and was replaced by Albert Finney.

Filmography

References

External links

 
 
 
 

1948 births
1989 deaths
American male film actors
American male television actors
American male musical theatre actors
American male stage actors
American male voice actors
Bellaire High School (Bellaire, Texas) alumni
University of Houston alumni
Male actors from Houston
20th-century American male actors
20th-century American singers
20th-century American male singers